The Italian Minister of the Navy was a member in the Council Ministers until 1947, when the ministry merged into the Ministry of Defence. The last Minister of Navy was Giuseppe Micheli, who served in the government of Alcide De Gasperi.

List of Ministers

Kingdom of Italy
 Parties

 Governments

Republic of Italy

References

Navy
1861 establishments in Italy